Dominic Alexander Sebastian Montserrat (2 January 1964 – 23 September 2004) was a British egyptologist and papyrologist.

Early life and education
Montserrat studied Egyptology at Durham University and received his PhD in Classics at University College London, specializing in Greek, Coptic and Egyptian Papyrology.

Academic career
From 1992 to 1999 he taught Classics at the University of Warwick. Suffering since birth from hemophilia, his increasingly deteriorating health led Montserrat to resign from teaching in 1999 and take up a research post in the classics department of The Open University. In 2004, he died from the effects of his illness at the age of forty.

Despite his ill health Montserrat was remarkably productive in his brief scholarly life: he was a member of the committee of the Egypt Exploration Society, for which he published regularly, and curated the award-winning travelling exhibition Ancient Egypt: Digging For Dreams of the Petrie Museum of Egyptian Archaeology. A wider audience saw him co-presenting the TV documentary series The Egyptian Detectives, a production of National Geographic Channel and Channel Five.

In his 1996 debut book Sex and Society in Graeco-Roman Egypt Montserrat presented a broad study of ancient sexuality and its cultural manifestations in Greco-Roman Egypt. His second book focused on the life and times of the "heretic pharaoh" Akhenaten (2000), whose long afterlife as an object of modern interpretations and appropriations he critically analyzed.

Selected works
 Sex and Society in Graeco-Roman Egypt, London & New York: Kegan Paul, 1996, 
 From Constantine to Julian: Pagan and Byzantine Views. A Source History, London & New York: Routledge, 1996 (co-editor),  
 Akhenaten: History, Fantasy and Ancient Egypt, London & New York: Routledge, 2000,

See also
 Amulet MS 5236

References

External links
 Association Internationale de Papyrologues: In memoriam Dominic Montserrat 1964–2004

British Egyptologists
British papyrologists
Academics of the Open University
Academics of the University of Warwick
Alumni of University College London
Alumni of Grey College, Durham
1964 births
2004 deaths